

Organization
The political head of the Ministry is the Minister for Tourism. Senior staff include the Permanent Secretary and other members of the Administration Section. The work of the Ministry is divided between the Technical Unit, which covers policy and planning, and the Leisure Unit, which promotes leisure activities for citizens and tourists.

Other public bodies also operate under the aegis of the Ministry: the Tourism Authority, which regulates the tourist industry, the Mauritius Tourism Promotion Authority, which promotes Mauritius as a tourist destination, and the Tourism Employees Welfare Fund.

Policy
According to the Ministry, "[T]he National Tourism Policy emphasizes low impact, high spending tourism", and sees Mauritius as a high-end tourist destination. The government's National Long-Term Perspective Study, published in 1997, noted the growth in tourist arrivals and proposed a "green ceiling" on the number of tourists to prevent overdevelopment of the island's environment, with increased revenue coming from higher spending per tourist. Tourist arrivals have grown from 422,463 in 1995 to a forecasted 1,030,000 for 2014. The continued growth in tourist arrivals has been criticized by We Love Mauritius, an environmental non-governmental organization.

In 1997, there were 87 hotels with a total capacity of 6,800 rooms and 14,100 bedplaces. Average room occupancy rates were 72% for all hotels and 78% for large hotels (defined as established beach hotels with more than 80 rooms). Figures for bed occupancy rates were 64% and 70% respectively. Several beachside resort hotels are owned and/or operated by large groups such as Sun International and Beachcomber Hotels. It is estimated that around 25% of visitors stay in non-hotel accommodation, such as boarding houses, self-catering bungalows and with friends and relatives.

The Ministry's Strategic Direction for 2013 to 2015 states that it seeks continued growth of at least 5% annually in the tourism sector, and addresses declining demand from traditional markets such as Europe by seeking customers from other regions such as China, India, and Russia. Mauritius also participates with other island nations in the Indian Ocean in the Vanilla Islands scheme to promote themselves collectively as a tourist destination.

See also
 Tourism in Mauritius

References

External links
 Ministry of Tourism overview

Government ministries of Mauritius
Tourism in Mauritius